Akmenės Cementas is a Lithuanian cement manufacturing company with a production of more than one million tons of cement annually.

References

Cement companies of Lithuania
1947 establishments in Lithuania
Manufacturing companies established in 1947
Companies listed on Nasdaq Vilnius
Manufacturing companies of the Soviet Union
Lithuanian brands